Eldred Kraemer (October 2, 1929 – September 16, 1992) was an American football guard. He played for the San Francisco 49ers in 1955.

References

1929 births
1992 deaths
Sportspeople from St. Cloud, Minnesota
Players of American football from Minnesota
American football guards
Pittsburgh Panthers football players
San Francisco 49ers players